Tara Browne (4 March 1945 – 18 December 1966) was a London-based Irish socialite and heir to the Guinness fortune. His December 1966 death in a car crash was an inspiration for the Beatles' song "A Day in the Life".

Early life 
Browne was the son of Dominick Browne, 4th Baron Oranmore and Browne, 2nd Baron Mereworth (an Anglo-Irish peer and member of the House of Lords who served in that house for 72 years, longer than any other peer up to that time, finally being evicted during government reforms in 1999) and Oonagh Guinness, an heiress to the Guinness fortune.

Browne was a member of Swinging London's counterculture of the 1960s and had stood to inherit £1 million at age 25. In August 1963, at age 18, he married Noreen "Nicky" MacSherry; the couple had two sons, Dorian and Julian.

For his 21st birthday, he threw a "lavish" party at Luggala, the Gothic Browne family seat in the Wicklow Mountains, where "two private jets flew the 200 or so guests to Ireland, including John Paul Getty, Mick Jagger, Brian Jones [and] Jones' then-girlfriend Anita Pallenberg."

Browne induced his friend Paul McCartney's first LSD trip in 1966, at Browne's home in Belgravia.

His life was captured in Paul Howard's biography I Read the News Today, Oh Boy, published in 2016.

Death
On 17 December 1966, Browne was driving with his girlfriend, model Suki Potier, in his Lotus Elan through South Kensington at high speed (some reports suggesting in excess of 106 mph/170 km/h). He was under the influence of alcohol and other drugs at the time. Browne failed to see a traffic light and proceeded through the junction of Redcliffe Square and Redcliffe Gardens, colliding with a parked lorry. He died of his injuries the following day. Potier claimed that Browne swerved the car to absorb the impact of the crash to save her life.

Following his death, his estranged wife launched a public legal battle for custody of their two young children; Browne's mother also sought custody. A judge eventually ruled that the boys should live with their grandmother.

"A Day in the Life"

The death of Browne is captured in the song "A Day in the Life" by the Beatles, which was released on their 1967 album Sgt. Pepper's Lonely Hearts Club Band. In a 1980 interview with Playboy magazine, John Lennon said, "I was reading the paper one day [...] the Guinness heir who killed himself in a car. That was the main headline story. He died in London in a car crash." Lennon, who was a friend of Browne, read the coroner's verdict into Browne's death while composing music at his piano. It was this news which inspired him to write the following lines:

In 1997, Paul McCartney gave a different explanation of these lines:  However, in his 2021 book The Lyrics, McCartney confirmed that the lyrics were about the death of Tara Browne.

References

External links
All Experts (archived)
Beatles Songfacts
I Read the News Today, Oh Boy - Paul Howard

1945 births
1966 deaths
Road incident deaths in London
Tara Browne
Younger sons of barons
The Beatles
Irish socialites
Irish expatriates in the United Kingdom
People from Dublin (city)